The Battle of Hova (Slaget vid Hova) was fought in Hova, Sweden on 14 June 1275 between peasants commanded by King Valdemar of Sweden and Danish cavalry commanded by  Duke Magnus and his brother Erik. The result was that Valdemar had to flee to Norway and Magnus became king of Sweden as Magnus III. It was a part of a series of conflicts between Magnus  and his elder brother Valdemar.

References

Battles involving Sweden